Varadaraju Sundramoorthy (born 6 October 1965) is a former Singaporean international footballer who played in the 1980s and 1990s, is widely touted as one of the country's most skilful and talented footballers ever. He is the current technical director of the Laos national football team.

He coached the LionsXII, a Singapore-based team playing in the Malaysia Super League, and held a dual appointment as the head coach of the Under-23 team from 2011 to 2013 when he announced his plans to sign with the Malaysian Premier League team, Negeri Sembilan. After coaching Negeri Sembilan for half a season in 2014, he returned to Singapore to take the helm at Tampines Rovers for almost 2 years, then a 2-year stint as head coach of Singapore.

Football career
Sundramoorthy broke into the Singapore-Malaysia Cup team in 1983 at just 18 years of age and in the following season, he became top scorer in the tournament.

Playing in Europe

In 1988, Sundramoorthy became the second player from Singapore to play in Europe when he signed for Swiss club FC Basel. He played there during the second half of their 1987–88 season (the season that Basel suffered relegation) under head coach Urs Siegenthaler. After playing in eight test games, he played his first match in the Swiss Super League in an away game on 20 March 1988 against Bulle. He scored his first goal for the club in the same game as Basel won 0–2. He played solely five league games, in which scored three goals. He was released to Old Boys at the end of the season.

He then joined Kedah FA for the Malaysia Cup tournament as he returned in 1989. During his playing days in Alor Setar playing his trade for Kedah FA, Sundramoorthy helped Kedah to defeat Singapore 3–1 in the final of the 1990 Malaysia Cup, scoring Kedah's opening goal.

During Singapore's run-up to the 1993 Malaysia Cup Final appearance, Sundramoorthy was one of the most influential players in the team. He was a player well known for his dribbling skills and his finishing.

One of Sundramoorthy's most famous goals was a bicycle kick scored against Brunei in a 1993 FAM Division II League tie at the National Stadium. He also scored a spectacular backheel during his days with Jurong FC. In a match against Pahang that same year, Sundramoorthy audaciously faked a backheel that fooled the Pahang defenders before crossing for Fandi Ahmad to score the winner late in the game.

In his later days, Sundramoorthy played domestically, first turning out for Woodlands Wellington FC in the league's inaugural year in 1996 before moving on to become the first-ever player-coach in S.League history for Jurong Football Club.

Sundramoorthy was nicknamed 'The Dazzler', which was also the name of his autobiography, at the height of his prowess and 'King Cobra' when he was at Jurong.

International career
Sundramoorthy made several appearances for the Singapore national football team, including at the 1990 Asian Games when he scored a hat-trick against Pakistan.  

Sundramoorthy also represented Singapore in several SEA Games and helped the Lions reach the final in 1989 when his last-minute through ball led to Fandi Ahmad's winner against Indonesia. He was one of the most feared Southeast Asian strikers the 1980s and early 1990s.

Coaching career
Since 2012 Sundramoorthy has been the head coach of the LionsXII, who played in the Malaysian Super League. In his first season in charge he led the LionsXII to 2nd place in the Malaysia Super League and the semi-finals of the Malaysia Cup.

On 21 January 2013, it was announced that Sundramoorthy would be appointed caretaker coach of the Singapore national football team while the Football Association of Singapore searched for a replacement for former coach Raddy Avramovic. His first game in charge was against Jordan on 6 February 2013 at Singapore's Jalan Besar Stadium.

On 15 May 2013, German coach Bernd Stange was announced as the new manager of the Singapore national football team while Sundramoorthy was appointed as the head coach of the Singapore national under-23 football team for the 2013 SEA Games. Aide Iskandar was named as his assistant.

On 7 October 2013, Sundramoorthy announced that he would not be renewing his contract with the Football Association of Singapore to coach the Lions XII Malaysian Super League Outfit. He took over as head coach at Malaysian Premier League side Negeri Sembilan on a two-year contract from 1 November 2013. After finishing sixth in the 2014 Malaysia Premier League and failing to qualify for the Malaysia Cup, Sundramoorthy was relieved of his duties by Negeri Sembilan.

In December 2014, Sundramoorthy was confirmed as the new head coach of the Tampines Rovers. This was the first time after 5 years that he held the head coach post in the S.League.

Sundramoorthy was unveiled as the head coach of the Singapore national football team in May 2016, on a one-year contract. He extended his contract as the Lions head coach for two more years in March 2017. However, one year later, he stepped down from his role by mutual consent on 9 April 2018. 

In October 2018, Sundramoorthy became the head coach of the Laos national football team. He was joined by V. Selvaraj who managed Laos' youth teams and also assisting him in the senior team. In October 2021, Sundramoorthy became the Technical Director of the team while Selvaraj took over his head coach position.

Honours

Player
Kedah
Malaysia Cup: 1990

Manager
LionsXII
Malaysia Super League: 2013

References

External links
 V. Sundramoorthy Interview

1965 births
Singaporean people of Indian descent
Living people
Singaporean footballers
Singaporean sportspeople of Indian descent
Singaporean expatriate footballers
Singapore international footballers
Singaporean expatriate sportspeople in Malaysia
Expatriate footballers in Malaysia
Expatriate footballers in Switzerland
FC Basel players
BSC Old Boys players
Kelantan FA players
Singapore FA players
Kedah Darul Aman F.C. players
Sri Pahang FC players
Jurong FC players
Singaporean Hindus
Singaporean people of Tamil descent
Association football midfielders
Association football forwards
LionsXII head coaches
Singapore Premier League head coaches
Jurong FC head coaches
Singapore Premier League players
Young Lions FC head coaches
Footballers at the 1990 Asian Games
Southeast Asian Games silver medalists for Singapore
Southeast Asian Games bronze medalists for Singapore
Southeast Asian Games medalists in football
Competitors at the 1983 Southeast Asian Games
Competitors at the 1985 Southeast Asian Games
Competitors at the 1989 Southeast Asian Games
Competitors at the 1991 Southeast Asian Games
Competitors at the 1993 Southeast Asian Games
Asian Games competitors for Singapore
Singaporean football managers
Singaporean expatriate football managers
Singaporean expatriate sportspeople in Laos
Singaporean expatriate sportspeople in Switzerland
Laos national football team managers
Expatriate football managers in Laos